Clive Raleigh Evatt  (6 June 1900 – 15 September 1984) was an Australian politician, barrister and raconteur. He was a member of the New South Wales Legislative Assembly from 1939 until 1959. At various times he sat as a member of the Industrial Labor Party, Labor Party and as an independent.

Early life
Clive Raleigh Evatt was born in East Maitland, the son of an immigrant publican who died when Evatt was one year old. His middle name was given in honour of his first cousin Raleigh Evatt, the son of his uncle Major-General Sir George Evatt. One of eight brothers, including H. V. Evatt, he was educated at Fort Street Boys' High School.

Evatt's family prevented him from enlisting in the First AIF, but allowed him to enroll in the Royal Military College, Duntroon from which he graduated as a lieutenant in 1921. He resigned from the army the following year to study law at the University of Sydney. While at university, he played Rugby league for University and New South Wales, and was the editor for Undergraduate journal Hermes. Evatt graduated and was admitted to the New South Wales Bar in 1926.

He married Marjorie Andreas, the daughter of Harry Andreas of Leuralla, in 1928 and they had three children: Elizabeth Evatt ; Penelope Seidler  and defamation barrister Clive Evatt Jnr.

Evatt's career as a barrister advanced rapidly and he was appointed a King's Counsel in 1935. He specialized in Workers' Compensation cases but also appeared in criminal cases, most notably in the Shark Arm case, where he successfully defended Patrick Brady.

Political career
In March 1939 he successfully contested the by-election caused by the death of James Webb, the member for Hurstville in the Legislative Assembly. Evatt had been endorsed by the Industrial Labor Party of Bob Heffron and defeated a candidate of the Australian Labor Party (NSW) supported by Jack Lang. This and a subsequent defeat at a by-election in Waverley signalled the end of Lang's term as Leader of the Australian Labor Party in New South Wales. The Industrial Labor Party was dissolved and Evatt was admitted to the Labor Party caucus when Lang was replaced as Labor leader by William McKell who subsequently led the ALP to victory at the 1941 election.

Evatt served in the governments of William McKell, James McGirr and Joseph Cahill as Minister for Education (1941–1944), Minister in Charge of Tourist Activities and Immigration (1946–1947), Minister for Housing (1947–1950 and 1952–1954) and Chief Secretary (1950–1952). As Housing minister, Evatt presided over the significant expansion of public housing administered by the Housing Commission and initiated various schemes of slum clearance in inner Sydney, such as in Redfern.

Tensions within the New South Wales branch of the Australian Labor Party leading up to the 1950s party split led to Cahill forcing Evatt from the cabinet. Evatt was expelled from the Labor Party on 13 July 1956 after he voted in parliament against a caucus decision to increase tram fares. He fought the subsequent election as an independent Labor candidate but he was defeated by the endorsed ALP candidate Bill Rigby.

Life after politics
After leaving politics he continued to work as a barrister with a large Worker's Compensation and defamation practice.

Evatt died at Darlinghurst on 15 September 1984, survived by his three children. His son was also named Clive and was also a barrister.

References

 

|-

|-

|-

|-

|-

1900 births
1984 deaths
Australian people of English descent
Australian King's Counsel
Australian rugby league players
Members of the New South Wales Legislative Assembly
Colonial Secretaries of New South Wales
New South Wales rugby league team players
People educated at Fort Street High School
Royal Military College, Duntroon graduates
Sydney University rugby league team players
20th-century Australian lawyers
Australian Labor Party members of the Parliament of New South Wales
20th-century Australian politicians
Australian Army officers
20th-century Australian military personnel